The European Rugby League (ERL) is the umbrella body for nations playing the sport of rugby league football across Europe. In the absence of other continental federations, ERL also controls rugby league in North America (including Central America), the Middle East and Africa.

History

2003-2019
The federation was founded January 2003 following an initiative between Richard Lewis, Executive Chairman of Britain's Rugby Football League (RFL) and his French counterpart Jean Paul Ferre. The RLEF's first constitution was approved in January 2004 and the federation's first Board of Directors was elected. This first Board of Directors consisted of Jean Paul Ferre as President/Chairman and Richard Lewis as Deputy Chairman with Nigel Wood and Nicolas Larrat being the other Board members. Representatives for Morocco, Italy, Serbia, Russia, Lebanon, Ireland, Scotland and Wales attended. Russia became a full member of the RLEF, joining Britain and France, and the RLIF soon after.

At the time of its foundation, the RLEF placed a "particular emphasis on generating development funding within each country". Historically, much of the development work conducted in Europe had been funded by the RFL. Following the profitable 2008 World Cup, the RFL and RLEF prepared to bid for funds to enhance their activities.

In December 2009, Kevin Rudd, a former  Scotland rugby league international, stepped down as Executive Officer of the RLEF after more than five years in the post. RLEF Chairman Richard Lewis stated that Rudd "has done an outstanding job and created a platform, structure and competitions framework that can take us into the future". Rudd was succeeded by  Danny Kazandjian. Kazandjian had previously been a key figure in the establishment of rugby league in Lebanon and had led the  RLEF's development drive in the Mediterranean and Middle East regions as Director of Development for the Euro-Med region.

2020-present
The RLEF was renamed the European Rugby League in 2021, in line with the RLIF's renaming to the International Rugby League.

After the 2022 Russian invasion of Ukraine, the European Rugby League banned Russia from all international rugby league competitions.

Competitions

ERL board

Current board

Former members: Chairperson: Maurice Watkins , Board Member: Blagoje Stoiljkovic

Membership
Currently eleven nations are full members of the federation; there are also fifteen affiliate members and nineteen official observers. Full members are entitled to a greater proportion of voting rights and to become members of the Rugby League International Federation.

In order to become an associate member, a nation must meet the following criteria:
 Implementation of a constitution and rules that commit the governing body to acting in the best interest of rugby league, throughout the whole of their country.
 Production of an annual financial report.
 Running a league competition with at least four teams.
 Implementation of a junior development programme.
 The production of a Business Development Plan outlining an organisation's future aims, including aims to find part funding for staff positions.
 A communications strategy.
 An administrators, match officials and coach education strategy.

The ERL stipulates that continued associate and full membership of the federation is subject to a check every two years to ensure that the minimum criteria are still being met.

Full members

Affiliate members

Official observers
  Albanian Rugby League
  Belgium Rugby League Association
  Bosnia and Herzegovina Rugby League Association
  Bulgarian Rugby League Federation
  Burundi Rugby League
  DR Congo Rugby League XIII
  Dansk Rugby League
  El Salvador Rugby League
  Ethiopia Rugby League
  Hungarian Rugby League Federation
  Kenya Rugby League
  Latvia Rugby League
  Libya Rugby League Association
  Montenegro Rugby League
  Palestinian Rugby League
  Polska Rugby XIII
  Saudi Arabian Rugby League Association
  Sierra Leone Rugby League
  Sweden Rugby League

Former observer members
  Rugby League Association of Catalonia
  Federația Româna de Rugby XIII
  Trinidad & Tobago Rugby League Association
  Emirates Rugby League

ERL national team results at World Cups

Official ERL rankings

See also

Rugby League International Federation
Asia-Pacific Rugby League Confederation

References

External links

International organisations based in London
Organisations based in Manchester
Organisations based in the City of London
 
Sports governing bodies in Europe